is a 2015 Japanese suspense action film directed by Eiichirō Hasumi and based on the Mozu series by Go Osaka and its Japanese television drama series adaptation of the same name. It was released on November 7, 2015.

Cast
Hidetoshi Nishijima
Teruyuki Kagawa
Yōko Maki
Sosuke Ikematsu
Atsushi Itō
Hana Sugisaki
Tsuyoshi Abe
Yūsuke Iseya
Tori Matsuzaka
Hiroki Hasegawa
Fumiyo Kohinata
Takeshi Kitano

Reception
By its third weekend, it had grossed .

References

External links
 

2015 action films
Films based on Japanese novels
Films based on television series
Films directed by Eiichirō Hasumi
Japanese action films
Toho films
2010s Japanese films
2010s Japanese-language films